Currant Creek Pass elevation  is a mountain pass in the Front Range of central Colorado in the United States.  The pass is a boundary between the Arkansas River basin and the Platte River basin.

References

Mountain passes of Colorado
Landforms of Park County, Colorado